Monday Osagie (born 31 December 1989) is a Nigerian professional footballer who last played as a center back for Brothers Union in the Bangladesh Football Premier League.

Career
Before playing in Bangladesh and India, Osagie played in his native Nigeria for Enyimba International, Kwara United, Sharks, and Warri Wolves. He then moved to Bangladesh to play for Rahmatganj MFS. He made his debut for the club on 31 July 2017 in a Bangladesh Premier League match against Arambagh Krira Sangha. He started the match and even scored a goal as Rahmatganj won 4–2.

Osagie then moved to India to play for Churchill Brothers. He made his debut for the club on 2 December 2017 against Shillong Lajong. He started but couldn't prevent Churchill Brothers from losing 2–0.

References

External links 
 Football Database Profile.

1989 births
Living people
Nigerian footballers
Enyimba F.C. players
Kwara United F.C. players
Sharks F.C. players
Churchill Brothers FC Goa players
Association football defenders
I-League players
Expatriate footballers in India